Nikolay Vladimirovich Zuyev (born 7 May 1970) is a Russian badminton player. He was part of the Russian Army team, and joined the national team in 1987.

Zuyev competed in badminton at the 1996 Summer Olympics in the men's doubles with partner Andrey Antropov. They were defeated by Antonius Ariantho and Denny Kantono of Indonesia (5-15, 1-15) in the quarter-finals, also in badminton at the 2004 Summer Olympics in the mixed doubles with partner Marina Yakusheva. They were defeated by Anggun Nugroho and Eny Widiowati of Indonesia in the round of 32. Zuyev got the silver medal in the men's doubles with Antropov at The 14th European Badminton Championships in Den Bosch, Netherlands, 10–17 April 1994. In his home country Russia he won 13 national titles until 2009 and three titles at the USSR National Badminton Championships.

Achievements

World Cup 
Men's doubles

European Championships 
Men's doubles

IBF World Grand Prix 
The World Badminton Grand Prix was sanctioned by the International Badminton Federation from 1983 to 2006.

Men's doubles

Mixed doubles

IBF International 
Men's doubles

Mixed doubles

References

External links 
 

1970 births
Living people
Sportspeople from Dnipro
Russian male badminton players
Soviet male badminton players
Badminton players at the 1996 Summer Olympics
Badminton players at the 2004 Summer Olympics
Olympic badminton players of Russia